Big Sky Airport  (also known as Ennis Big Sky Airport) is a county-owned, public-use airport located six nautical miles (7 mi, 11 km) southeast of the central business district of Ennis, a town in Madison County, Montana, United States. It is included in the National Plan of Integrated Airport Systems for 2011–2015, which categorized it as a general aviation airport.

Although many U.S. airports use the same three-letter location identifier for the FAA and IATA, this facility is assigned EKS by the FAA but has no designation from the IATA.

Facilities and aircraft 
Big Sky Airport has one runway designated 16/34 with an asphalt surface measuring 6,600 by 75 feet (2,012 x 23 m).

For the 12-month period ending September 16, 2009, the airport had 11,000 aircraft operations, an average of 30 per day: 97% general aviation and 3% air taxi. At that time there were 19 aircraft based at this airport: 79% single-engine, 16% multi-engine, and 5% jet.

Choice Aviation, the airport's fixed-base operator (FBO), offers fuel, flight instruction, aircraft/hangar rental, and other services.

On 19 February 2020, Big Sky Airport was awarded a $5.6 million FAA grant to extent the main taxiway to 7,600 ft (2,316 m), repave portions of the runway, and expand the airport property.

References

External links 
 

Airports in Montana
Transportation in Madison County, Montana
Buildings and structures in Madison County, Montana